Saidat is a feminine given name of Arabic Origin meaning happy and fortunate. It is the female version of Sayed. Many Nigerian Muslims name their children Saidat. You may refer to:

Saidat Onanuga (born 1974), Nigerian track athlete
Saidat Adegoke (born 1985), Nigerian footballer

Feminine given names
Nigerian names